Glenella is a community within the Municipality of Glenella – Lansdowne. It is located northeast of Neepawa and was designated a post office and a CNR point in 1897. Its name came from a Miss Ella Williams with the addition of the "glen". The R.M. was created in 1920 and amalgamated in 2015.

Notable people
 Stephen Patrick - Politician and athlete.

References 

 Geographic Names of Manitoba (pg. 93) - the Millennium Bureau of Canada

Unincorporated communities in Central Plains Region, Manitoba